5653 Camarillo, provisional designation , is a stony asteroid and near-Earth object of the Amor group, approximately 1.5 kilometers in diameter.

It was discovered on 21 November 1992, by American astronomers Eleanor Helin and Kenneth Lawrence at Palomar Observatory in California, United States. The asteroid was named for the Californian town of Camarillo.

Orbit and classification 

Camarillo orbits the Sun at a distance of 1.2–2.3 AU once every 2 years and 5 months (878 days). Its orbit has an eccentricity of 0.30 and an inclination of 7° with respect to the ecliptic.

A first precovery was taken at the Australian Siding Spring Observatory in 1974, extending the body's observation arc by 18 years prior to its official discovery observation at Palomar.

Physical characteristics 

The S-type asteroid has also been characterized as a Sr-subtype, a transitional group to the R-type asteroids.

Lightcurves 

Between 1995 and 2015, several rotational lightcurves of Camarillo gave a well-defined rotation period of 4.834 hours with a brightness amplitude between 0.4 and 0.85 magnitude.

Diameter and albedo 

According to the surveys carried out by NASA's space-based Wide-field Infrared Survey Explorer with its subsequent NEOWISE mission, Camarillo has an albedo between 0.21 and 0.25 with a corresponding diameter of 1.53 to 1.57 kilometers.

Naming 

This minor planet was named after for the Californian town of Camarillo and its Camarillo Observatory. The town was named after Adolfo Camarillo (1864–1958), a well known regional rancher. The first discoverer is a former town resident. The official naming citation was published by the Minor Planet Center on 4 August 2001.

References

References

External links 
 Asteroid Lightcurve Database (LCDB), query form (info )
 Dictionary of Minor Planet Names, Google books
 Asteroids and comets rotation curves, CdR – Observatoire de Genève, Raoul Behrend
 
 
 

005653
Discoveries by Eleanor F. Helin
Discoveries by Kenneth J. Lawrence
Named minor planets
19921121